Chain of Lagoons is a locality and small rural community in the local government area of Break O'Day, in the North-east region of Tasmania. The Tasman Sea forms its eastern boundary. The 2016 census determined a population of 21 for the state suburb of Chain of Lagoons.

History
The locality name is believed to be derived from the several lagoons in the vicinity.

Road infrastructure
The Tasman Highway passes through from south to north, and intersects with the A4 route (Elephant Pass Road) within the locality.

References

Localities of Break O'Day Council
Towns in Tasmania